Mujahid Ali (born 3 April 1972) is a Pakistani politician who had been a member of the National Assembly of Pakistan, from August 2018 till January 2023. Previously he was a member of the National Assembly from June 2013 to May 2018.

Early life
He was born on 3 April 1972.

Political career

He ran for the seat of the Provincial Assembly of Khyber Pakhtunkhwa as a candidate of Pakistan Peoples Party (PPP) from Constituency PK-25 (Mardan-III) in 2008 Pakistani general election but was unsuccessful. He received 7,035 votes and lost the seat to a candidate of Awami National Party (ANP).

Ali was elected to the National Assembly of Pakistan as a candidate of Pakistan Tehreek-e-Insaf (PTI) from Constituency NA-11 (Mardan-III) in 2013 Pakistani general election. He received 38,233 votes and defeated a candidate of PPP.

In 2013, he called for release of Mumtaz Qadri which created a controversy.

He was re-elected to the National Assembly as a candidate of PTI from Constituency NA-20 (Mardan-I) in 2018 Pakistani general election. He received 78,140 votes and defeated Gul Nawaz Khan, a candidate of ANP.

References

Living people
Pakistan Tehreek-e-Insaf politicians
Pashtun people
People from Mardan District
Pakistani MNAs 2013–2018
1972 births
Pakistani MNAs 2018–2023